Ben Sonnemans (born 13 January 1972, Haarlem) is a Dutch judoka.

Achievements

References

External links
 

1972 births
Living people
Dutch male judoka
Judoka at the 1996 Summer Olympics
Judoka at the 2000 Summer Olympics
Olympic judoka of the Netherlands
Sportspeople from Haarlem
20th-century Dutch people
21st-century Dutch people